This list of mines in Oregon summarizes the mines listed by the Geographic Names Information System.  As of January 7, 2014, there are 595 entries.

See also 
 Lists of Oregon-related topics
 Lists of mines in the United States

 
Oregon
Oregon geography-related lists